Federalist Paper No. 29 is an essay by Alexander Hamilton, the twenty-ninth of The Federalist Papers. It was published in The Independent Journal on January 9, 1788 under the pseudonym Publius, the name under which all The Federalist papers were published. It is titled "Concerning the Militia". Unlike the rest of the Federalist Papers, which were published more or less in order, No. 29 did not appear until after Federalist No. 36.

Hamilton states that a well-regulated militia composed of the people will be more uniform and beneficial to the "public defense" of Americans. He argues that an excessively large militia can harm a nation's work force, as not everyone can leave their profession to go through military exercises. Thus, a smaller, but still well-regulated militia, is the answer.  In the end, Hamilton concludes that the militia, as it is constituted directly of the people and managed by the states, is not a danger to liberty when called into use by other states to do things such as quell insurrections.

Background 
The Articles of Confederation were ratified on March 1, 1781 to be the first constitution of the United States. Its formation came from the urgent need to stabilize the new states recently liberated from British administration. It became evident that future prosperity relied on a new structure that gave power back to the general government. At first, people were unsure if this reform would be either beneficial or detrimental to future society. The uncertainty in public opinion had to be answered in order to put the people's trust in the new constitution. Alexander Hamilton, James Madison, and John Jay collectively wrote eighty five essays, known as the Federalist Papers, to persuade people, from those in politics to the average citizen, that the new constitution will be aid in the growth of the young nation. Alexander Hamilton's Federalist 29: "Concerning the Militia", describes what he implies would become of the militia. Historically, militias have been an intricate part in the lives of the people before and after the Revolution. Alone, separate militias would have been vastly insufficient in terms of comparability to fighting an army such as the British. However, these battalions do reserve a role in the new nation.

Hamilton Argument 

The militia's main responsibility would be to protect the nation from phenomena that can or will endanger national security. First, in "The Federalist 29", Hamilton writes that, "It requires no skill in the science of war to discern that uniformity in the organization and discipline in the militia would be attended with the most beneficial effects'". 

Unlike militias of the past, Hamilton viewed new militias as a uniformed group similar to that of an organized military. "It is, therefore, with the most evident propriety, that the plan of the convention proposes to empower the Union 'to provide for organizing, arming, and disciplining, the militia, and for governing such part of them as may be employed in the service of the United states…" (James Madison, John Jay, The Federalist, books.google.com). Also, they would contain the same kind of intelligence the military would have access to. 

The essay also indicated that each state will be responsible for having their own militia. Other than the federal government having their involvement, each individual state will be held responsible for training and selecting various officers who meet the requirements given to them by Congress. Hamilton viewed that having these militias would also give power to the Union itself and avoid having civilians feel confined by the power of the federal government. Militias would also reduce the need for military camps being built, decreasing the feeling of the government's presence. The kind of involvement the federal government would have over the militias would be to call them for aid in the case that the standing military showed to be a threat to the civil liberties of the people. 

Hamilton's plan included many innovations which would accompany this new based militia to fit the standard he saw ideal. One major change would be the personnel who the militias consist of. Instead of just a disorganized group made up of random people, the militias will be composed of well trained civilians on the same level or near that of a military soldier. "To oblige the great body of the yeomanry, and of the other classes of the citizens, to be under arms for the purposes of going through military exercises and evolutions, as often as might be necessary to acquire the degree of perfection which would entitle them to the character of a well-regulated militia, would be a real grievance to the people, and serious public inconvenience and loss. It would from an annual deduction from the productive labor of the country… to an amount which, calculating upon the present numbers of the people, would not fall far short of the whole expense of the civil establishments of all the States. To attempt a thing which would abridge the mass of labor and industry to so considerable an extent, would be unwise, and the experiment, if made, could not succeed, because it would not long be endured. Little more can reasonably be aimed at, with respect to the people at large, than to have them properly armed and equipped; and in order to see that this be not neglected, it will be necessary to assemble them once or twice in the course of a year."(James Madison, John Jay, The Federalist, books.google.com).

These words would have been well known to the founding fathers dating back to at least Patrick Henry's three Resolutions on March 23, 1775 at the Virginia Convention, held in the Henrico Parish Church, now called St. John's Church -- and indeed are practically a quote from Patrick Henry's 1st Resolution. 

Hamilton makes the point that the overall size of the militia had to be realistic. He indicated that an excessively large militia could have a negative impact on the labor economy. Therefore, he believes that it would function most appropriately if the militias would be preferably smaller and more well trained. "This will not only lessen the call for military establishments, but if circumstances should at any time oblige the government to form an army of any magnitude that army can never be formidable to the liberties of the people while there is a large body of citizens, little, if at all, inferior to them in discipline and the use of arms, who stand ready to defend their own rights and those of their fellow citizens. This appears to me the only substitute that can be devised for a standing army, and the best possible security against it, if it should exist".

Hamilton then proceeds to attack critics of the Constitution who argued that the federal government would abuse its militia power. Likening their criticisms to "some ill written tale or romance, which instead of natural and agreeable images, exhibits to the mind nothing but frightful and distorted shapes", he argues that they are "absurdities". Taking, for example, the "exaggerated and improbable suggestions which have taken place respecting the power of calling for the services of the militia", he notes the absurdity of the idea that the federal government will be able to call people from their homes to subjugate their neighbors, or serve as debt payments to foreign powers.

Ultimately, Hamilton argues, the militia will be used to defend a "neighboring State" from a "common enemy" or to "guard the republic against the violence of faction and sedition". By its nature, the militia will not be easy for the federal government to abuse, and will instead act as a check on tyranny.

Anti Federalist/ Opposition Argument 
In the Anti-Federalist papers, the authors wrote about their concern about giving more power to the Federal Government. "Centinel feared not only a standing army but the abuse of local militias by the national government."(Paul Finkelman, Complete Anti-Federalist, scholarship.law.cornell.edu). When it came to the militias, one author writing under the pseudonym "Centinel" felt that the militias were just another tool the general government had to use however they pleased. Other authors, such as Maryland's Luther Martin, similarly questioned federal control over the state militias. Martin feared that congressional authority over the militias meant that "the only defence and protection which the state can have for the security of their rights against arbitrary encroachments of the general government, is taken entirely out of the power of their respective States, and placed under the power of Congress."(Paul Finkelman, Complete Anti-Federalist, scholarship.law.cornell.edu). Martin went on to show his concerns about the power the federal government would have by saying the states are left basically useless and could easily become "slaves" to the national government. Despite having militias in each state, the federal government still had power over the militias. Alexander Hamilton understood the opposition to the Federalist views on Militias. The extensive control by the federal government was worrisome to those who opposed this essay. "...What reason could there be to infer, that force was intended to be the sole instrument of authority, merely because there is a power to make use of it when necessary?"(James Madison, John Jay, The Federalist, books.google.com). He mentions the possibility of forming corps with young soldiers who are willing for their country. "... The attention of the government ought particularly to be directed to the formation of a select corps of moderate extent, upon such principles as will really fit them for service in case of need"(James Madison, John Jay, The Federalist, books.google.com). Hamilton wrote that the militia would be composed of soldiers who would not just protect and serve their country but ensure that it does not become corrupt. He also mentioned in his essay that some people see this idea as unrealistic. "There is something so far-fetched and so extravagant in the idea of danger to liberty from the militia, that one is at a loss whether to treat it with gravity or with raillery ...  Where, in the name of common-sense, are our fears to end if we may not trust our sons, our brothers, our neighbors, our fellow citizens?"(James Madison, John Jay, The Federalist, books.google.com). Hamilton argues to critics who doubt that the militia would be trusted that they forget militia is made up of the people the average citizen would know and trust.

References

Primary Sources 

 Finkelman, Paul. "Complete Anti-Federalist." (1984): 182.
 Madison, James, and John Jay. The federalist. GP Putnam's sons, 1888.
 Duvall, Edward D. "Practical Aspects of Gun Control, Part 3." (2013).
 Neubauer, Martin. A Civil-Military Crisis? Tocqueville's Theory of Civil-Military Relations. No. NDU-NWC-99-E-34. NATIONAL WAR COLL WASHINGTON DC, 1998.
 Massaro, John. "What the Second Amendment Meant to the Founders."Soapbox Weekly, February 11 (2013).
 Potter, Michael Ross. "Governing With One Hand on the Plow Adding the Voice of Federal Farmer to the Constitutional School of American Public Administration." Administration & Society 44.7 (2012): 779-799.
 History.com Staff. "Articles of Confederation." History.com. A&E Television Networks, 2009. Web. 11 Oct. 2016.
 "Minutemen." Ushistory.org. Independence Hall Association, n.d. Web. 11 Oct. 2016.
 "National Guard." How We Began. N.p., n.d. Web. 11 Oct. 2016.
 "Militia in the Revolutionary War, Yorktown Victory Center." History Is Fun. N.p., n.d. Web. 11 Oct. 2016.

External links 

 Text of The Federalist No. 29: congress.gov

29
1788 in American law
1788 essays
1788 in the United States